The emphasis on English education in China only emerged after 1979 when the Cultural Revolution ended, China adopted the Open Door Policy, and the United States and China established strong diplomatic ties. One estimate (in 2007) of the number of English speakers in China is over 200 million and rising, with 50 million secondary school children now studying the language.

However, online test score data from the 2018 EF English Proficiency Index ranks the nation at 47th out of the 88 countries measured, with an overall score of 'Low proficiency.' It suggested that internet users in cities and provinces like Shanghai, Beijing, Tianjin, and Jiangsu had a generally decent command of the language while those in other cities were limited to basic vocabulary. A 2017 article from The Telegraph also suggests that less than 1 percent of people in China (some 10 million) speak English conversationally.

According to a report on China Daily, many students start learning English in kindergarten before they start school. Most schoolchildren are taught their first English lesson in third grade in primary school. Despite the fact that it is common to learn English at an early age, some have criticized the pedagogy for being geared towards only the skills being tested. Therefore, skills such as learning grammar rules become more focused on memorization. However, creative skills such as writing are still an important part of English education in China. The methods, which focus on testing students' memorization of grammar rules and vocabulary, have been criticized by Western educationalists and linguists as fundamentally flawed. Furthermore, students are seldom able to put newly learned English words into use. This problem arises because Mandarin is the official and dominant language in China, while English often has little use in the country. This problem is further reinforced through the national Band 4 examination, where 80% of the test is the writing component and 20% of the test is listening, while an additional speaking component is only required for English major students. However, Guangdong Province has started requiring all students to take the English speaking exam for the National College Entrance Examination as of 2010.

History
China's first contact with the English language occurred between Chinese and English traders, and the first missionary schools to teach English were established in Macau in the 1630s. Between 1911 and 1949, English was popular, it was taught in missionary schools and thirteen Christian colleges. After the founding of the People's Republic of China in 1949, Russian was originally the primary foreign language. English began to transition into the education system during the 1960s as a result of the Sino-Soviet split. Because of the condemnation of the English language during the Cultural Revolution, English education did not return until Richard Nixon visited China in 1972. The only textbooks for English instructions were translations of Mao Zedong's works until the Cultural Revolution ended in 1976, and the Gaokao was restored in 1978.

In 1978 about 500,000 people in China were subscribed to the magazine Learning English, and in 1982 the BBC program Follow Me had about 10 million households in China as viewers.

Once China established the open door policy under Deng Xiaoping, the popularity of English and other languages began to thrive. English became very popular between the late 1970s to 1990s in areas that dealt with trading and tourism

In 2021 Li Yuan in The New York Times wrote that there was a trend countering English language education in China.

Testing
The College English Test (CET) is the primary English language test in China. As of 2011, employers have made scores in the CET 4 and CET 6 requirements for employment, and The Lowdown on China's Higher Education stated that in China "CET 4 and CET 6 National English examinations have become the symbol of English proficiency in reading and writing."

There is also the Public English Test System (PETS).

Hospitality industry

Tourism in China is a major industry, producing 11.04% of the GDP and contributing direct and indirect employment of up to 28.25 million people. Nonetheless, not many employees in the hospitality sector speak English. One source indicates that it's more common in premium-grade hotels "while less expensive hotels might have few or no staff members who speak English". Bilingual guide services are readily available, however.

Online English Education
Recently, online education has been gaining momentum in China, including online one on one English education. Many Chinese companies, such as Magic Ears, are recruiting teachers from the U.S. and other English-speaking countries. Leading players such as New Oriental Education & Technology Group and TAL Education Group have gone public in the US and seen their shares soar. Now, online start-ups are gaining ground with parents who grew up in the internet era and see advantages in digital learning. Beijing-based VIPKid has expanded to 200,000 students and just raised venture money at a valuation of more than US$1.5 billion. The virtual teaching business is booming. Both VIPKid and DaDa were founded in 2013 and have continued to grow since then. VIPKid had more than 500,000 students in China and 63 other countries and 60,000 North American teachers, while Dada had more than 100,000 students and 10,000 teachers. Their competitors have grown too: companies like Magic Ears and QKids are also connecting teachers to Chinese children working on learning English.

In 2021 the Chinese authorities banned the use of foreign-based teachers for online tutoring, forcing VIPkid to end its foreign-based tutoring service for Chinese students.

See also
 Teaching English as a foreign language
 English-medium education
 Web International English - A former chain of English education centers
 EMI schools - English medium schools in Hong Kong

References
 Fu, Shiyi (Xiamen University College of Foreign Languages). "Teaching Writing to English Majors at the Tertiary Level in China─Reflections on Material Development and Teaching Methodology." (Archive). English Discourse and Intercultural Communication, Volume 1 (2007) (第一屆英語教學、話語及跨文化交流國際研討會 Archive). Macao and Ürümqi, July 8 – 14 2007 中國澳門及烏魯木齊 2007 年7 月8 日至14 日.
 "Editorial Note" (PDF page 9/30): Qiang, Niu and Martin Wolff (editors). The Lowdown on China's Higher Education. Cambridge Scholars Publishing, 2011. . p. i-18 (Archive) (Including Chapters One and Two).

Notes

 Some content originates from Education in China

Further reading
 Adamson, Bob. China's English: A History of English in Chinese Education (Volume 1 of Asian Englishes Today). Hong Kong University Press, April 1, 2004. , 9789622096639.
 Bianco, Joseph Lo, Jane Horton, and Gao Yihong (editors). China and English: Globalisation and the Dilemmas of Identity (Critical language and literacy studies). Multilingual Matters, 2009. .
 Feng, Anwei (editor). English Language Education Across Greater China (Volume 80 of Bilingual education and bilingualism). Multilingual Matters, 2011. . - Read at Google Books
 Liu, Jun. English language teaching in China: new approaches, perspectives and standards. Continuum International Publishing Group, 2007. , 9780826480767.
 Liu, Siping (Wuhan University and the University of Nevada Las Vegas). "Teaching English in China: Conflicts and Expectations" (Archive). The International Journal - Language Society and Culture. ISSN 1327-774X.
 Ruan, Jiening and Cynthia B. Leung (editors). Perspectives on Teaching and Learning English Literacy in China (Volume 3 of Multilingual Education). Springer, November 29, 2012. , 9789400749948.
 Stanley, Phiona. A Critical Ethnography of ‘Westerners’ Teaching English in China: Shanghaied in Shanghai (Routledge Critical Studies in Asian Education). Routledge, February 11, 2013. , 9781135135683.
 

Language education in China
English-language education